The Turney Center Industrial Complex is a state prison in Only, Hickman County, Tennessee, owned and operated by the Tennessee Department of Correction.  The facility opened in 1971 originally serving as Turney Center for Youthful Offenders. Later changed to Turney Center Prison, Turney Center Industrial Farm and Prison and by 2008 assuming its current name of Turney Center Industrial Complex. 

Turney also has a minimum-security Annex at 245 Carroll Road, Clifton, Wayne County, Tennessee. This facility opened in 1985 and was formerly the Wayne County Boot Camp.

Notable prisoners
Brandon E. Banks - rapist in Vanderbilt rape case
Kong Bounnam - starred in "I almost got away with it"
Bruce Mendenhall - "The Truckstop Killer"
Billy Bridges - shot and killed his wife at an interstate rest stop

References 

Prisons in Tennessee
Buildings and structures in Hickman County, Tennessee
Buildings and structures in Wayne County, Tennessee
1971 establishments in Tennessee